Bing Futch (b. Hollywood, California, December 16, 1966) is a musician whose primary instrument is the mountain dulcimer. In 1986 he co-founded Christian techno-punk trio Crazed Bunnyz along with Marc "Gadget" Plainguet and Sean "Shaka" Harrison. He relocated to Orlando, Florida in 1993 and also plays the Native American flute, ukulele, and drums.

Futch has composed and produced soundtracks for film, theater, television and themed attractions.  In 1994, he wrote and recorded music for The Castle of Miracles at Give Kids The World Village in Kissimmee, Florida.
In 1999, Futch formed Americana band Mohave, featuring the mountain dulcimer as the main instrument.  The group has performed at the House of Blues in Walt Disney World, Hard Rock Live at Universal Studios Florida and has opened for Molly Hatchet, among other acts. Futch performs using regular and baritone mountain dulcimers as well as custom-made dual-fretboard and resonator instruments, and is one of only two mountain dulcimer players to compete in the history of the International Blues Challenge, advancing to the semi-finals in the 2015 edition of the competition. During the 2016 edition of the International Blues Challenge, Futch made it to the finals and was awarded "Best Guitarist" in the solo-duo category, despite performing solely on the Appalachian mountain dulcimer. He is the grandson of the late boxing hall-of-famer Eddie Futch.

Northwest Airlines incident
On June 14, 2009, Futch was en route to a show in Ft. Wayne, Indiana on Northwest Airlines flight 2363 from Detroit, Michigan. During that time, baggage handlers damaged his double-necked mountain dulcimer. Encouraged by fans to write a song about the incident, and after seeing Dave Carroll's "United Breaks Guitars" on YouTube, Futch penned "Only a Northwest Song" on July 10, 2009, and posted it to the service, hoping it would help to avoid a "lengthy reimbursement battle." Within a day of the video's posting, Northwest Airlines contacted Futch to offer their apologies along with compensation.

Question on Jeopardy!

On February 16, 2011, during the finale of a three-day Jeopardy! pitting returning champs Ken Jennings and Brad Rutter against IBM's Supercomputer Watson, Futch's name appeared as one of three possible questions for the answer "Nearly 10 million YouTubers saw Dave Carroll's clip called 'this friendly skies' airline 'breaks guitars.'" Watson offered up "United Airlines" with an 81% probability of being correct, "United Breaks Guitars" was the second choice with a probability of 13% and "Futch" was the third choice with a probability of 7%.

Discography
Castaway: Original Soundtrack, 1986
Kansas, 1987
Buy Dis Album Ore God Will Disconnect My Fone, 1987
The Girl and the Book, 1987
21, 1987
Fantasy Amidst The Storm, 1989
70 mm, 1994
Dulcimerica: Volume 1, 2006
Dulcimer Rock, 2007
Kokopelli Rising, 2008
Christmas Each Day, 2008
Dulcimerica: Volume 2, 2010
Storm's Sigh, 2011
Live At Old Songs!, 2012
Dive!, 2013
All Songs Lead To The Gift Shop, 2014
Unresolved Blues, 2015
Dulcimerica: Volume 3, 2015
Sweet River, 2015
Return Of Live At Old Songs, 2016
Live From Ditty TV, 2016
Synth For A Season, 2016
What's Old Becomes New Again, 2017
The Improv Files: Year One, 2018
The Beauty and the Terror, 2021

With Nutty Faith:
It's Our Job, 1985

With Crazed Bunnyz:
Achtung: Musik Klirrfaktor, 1986
Live!, 1987
Transition, 1987
Blutgasse, 1988

With Mohave:
Homegrown, 1999
Spider Rock, 2000
Live At Leu Gardens, 2003
Clear Blue Trickling, 2005

With Naked Head:
Beautiful Disruption, 2002

With Manitou:
In The Garden Of The Gods, 2009

As Producer:
 Wendy Songe Test Drive, 2015
 Wendy Songe ''Driven, 2016

References

External links

Reverbnation Page
Bing Futch: Listen Again – AXS
"Versatile dulcimer player is among the talent at folk festival", AARIK DANIELSEN (Columbia Daily Tribune)
Hearts of the Dulcimer-Podcast Episode 009: Bing Futch: Dulcimer Road Warrior
Hearts of the Dulcimer-Podcast Episode 016: Blues On Dulcimer

Appalachian dulcimer players
People from Hollywood, Los Angeles
1966 births
Living people
People from Orlando, Florida